We the People is the debut album by alternative hip-hop group Flipsyde, released by Interscope Records subsidiary Cherrytree on July 12, 2005.

Promotion
Flipsyde toured Europe with Snoop Dogg and The Black Eyed Peas in support of the album, and sales were spurred by the single "Someday" being played in advertising for NBC's broadcast of the 2006 Winter Olympics. We the People peaked at #43 on Billboard's Top Heatseekers chart in 2006, and sold 62,000 copies.

A limited-edition reissue including five additional tracks was released in 2006, packaged with an accompanying DVD.

Reception
We the People was named the "best hip-hop album" of 2005 by Geoffrey Himes of The Washington Post, for its "combination of live instruments, political commentary, introspection and catchy melodies".

Track listing

Chart history

References

External links
 

2005 albums
Flipsyde albums